Act Surprised is the ninth studio album by American indie rock band Sebadoh. It is the band's first album in six years. The album was released on May 24, 2019.

The album has seven songs each by Lou Barlow and Jason Loewenstein and one by Bob D’Amico.

Track listing
 "Phantom" (Jason Loewenstein) – 2:23
 "Celebrate the Void" (Lou Barlow) – 3:09
 "Follow the Breath" (Loewenstein) – 2:13
 "Medicate" (Barlow) – 3:34
 "See-Saw" (Barlow) – 3:37
 "Vacation" (Loewenstein) – 2:06
 "Stunned" (Loewenstein) – 2:25
 "Fool" (Barlow) – 2:34
 "Raging River" (Loewenstein) – 3:11
 "Sunshine" (Barlow) – 3:30 
 "Act Surprised" (Loewenstein) – 3:11
 "Battery" (Loewenstein) – 3:12
 "Belief" (Barlow) – 2:55
 "Leap Year" (Bob D'Amico) – 3:15
 "Reykjavic" (Barlow) – 3:32

Personnel
Sebadoh
Lou Barlow – vocals, guitar, bass
Jason Loewenstein – vocals, bass, guitar
Bob D'Amico – drums, percussion

References

External links

Act Surprised at Bandcamp

2019 albums
Sebadoh albums
Dangerbird Records albums